Richard Renwick (born 27 November 1942) was an English professional footballer who made over 390 appearances as a full back in the Football League, most notably for Aldershot and Brentford.

Playing career

Grimsby Town 
Renwick began his career at Second Division strugglers Grimsby Town in 1962 and departed the club the following year, without making an appearance.

Aldershot 
In July 1963, Renwick dropped down to the Fourth Division to sign for Aldershot. He was a near ever-present for his first five seasons at the club. After making just seven appearances during the 1968–69 season, he departed the Shots in February 1969. During his five and a half years at the Recreation Ground, Renwick made 231 appearances and scored four goals.

Brentford 
Renwick joined Fourth Division club Brentford for a £1,500 fee in February 1969. He made 106 appearances in just over two seasons and departed Griffin Park after rejecting a new contract at the end of the 1970–71 season. A hard player, teammate Jackie Graham later revealed Renwick "used to count how many stitches he'd put into people!".

Stockport County 
Renwick joined Fourth Division strugglers Stockport County in October 1971. He made 32 appearances and scored one goal during his single season at Edgeley Park, in which County finished second-from-bottom and won re-election to the Football League.

Rochdale 
Renwick moved up to the Third Division to sign for Rochdale in July 1972. He made 41 appearances during the 1972–73 season, but fell out of favour in the following campaign and left the club at the end of the 1973–74 season.

Darlington (loan) 
Renwick returned to his native northeast to sign for Fourth Division club Darlington on loan in January 1974 and made 19 league appearances for the club.

Personal life 
In the 2000s, Renwick was living in the Burnley area.

Career statistics

References

1942 births
Footballers from Northumberland
English footballers
Brentford F.C. players
English Football League players
Grimsby Town F.C. players
Aldershot F.C. players
Stockport County F.C. players
Rochdale A.F.C. players
Darlington F.C. players
Association football fullbacks
Living people
People from Gilsland